Tommy Ingebrigtsen (born 8 August 1977) is a Norwegian former ski jumper who competed from 1993 to 2007, representing Byåsen IL in Trondheim. He won the large hill competition at the 1995 Nordic World Ski Championships in Thunder Bay, at the age of seventeen. Ingebrigtsen also competed in two Winter Olympics, earning a bronze in the team large hill event at Turin in 2006. He twice held the world distance record, both set in Planica, with a jump of 219.5 metres on 20 March 1999 and 231 m on 20 March 2005.

Tommy, himself a rock guitarist (Arabs in Aspic), is the son of musician Dag Ingebrigtsen.

Sports results
1995 FIS Nordic World Ski Championships – Gold: Individual large hill
2003 FIS Nordic World Ski Championships- Silver: Individual normal hill, Bronze: Team large hill
2006 Winter Olympics – Bronze: Team large hill

World Cup

Standings

Ski jumping world records

References

|-

1977 births
Living people
Norwegian male ski jumpers
Olympic bronze medalists for Norway
Olympic ski jumpers of Norway
Ski jumpers at the 2002 Winter Olympics
Ski jumpers at the 2006 Winter Olympics
Olympic medalists in ski jumping
FIS Nordic World Ski Championships medalists in ski jumping
Medalists at the 2006 Winter Olympics
World record setters in ski flying
Sportspeople from Trondheim